Mikael Colombu is a French music video and film director. He created the animation style Jankyvision.

Early life and career
Colombu was born in Paris, France on April 25, 1975. Colombu's father, Jean Pierre Colombu, was a French surgeon and his mother, Jeanne-Aelia Desparmet Hart, was a French fashion designer. Colombu moved with his mother and younger brother Kevin Colombu to New York City in 1986, then Boston in 1988, and back to New York City in 1991. Colombu relocated back to Paris, France in 1993 at the age of 18. Colombu began attending art school in 1996.

Career & Style
In 2010 Colombu created the animation style Jankyvision which is made mostly with photography. Jankyvision debuted as a project music video for the singer Bilal.

In 2013, Colombu directed a commercial for TY KU starring CeeLo Green.

Videography
 Bilal – "Robots"
 Onra - "Intro"
 J Dilla - "Bus-A-Yo"
 CeeLo Green - "Bodies"
 The Weeknd - "The Knowing"
 Cee Lo Green - "This Christmas"
 Dirty Radio - "Found You"
 Drake - "We'll Be Fine"

References

External links
Official website

French music video directors
Living people
Film directors from Paris
1975 births